Valley High School is an alternative, continuation high school, part of the Escondido Union High School District in Escondido, California. VHS has nearly thirty to fifty new students every month.

Response-Ability Training Program

Response-Ability Training Program (RTP) is a Quarter 9 week long program/class that all newly enrolled students at Valley High are required to attend before becoming full-time students, and before receiving a full class schedule at Valley. The training program teaches many things including the importance of an education, personal responsibility, respecting others and always coming to school prepared. RTP renews every nine weeks at Valley High with new students and is currently taught by Monica Lee the CCEA (California Continuation Education Association) teacher of the year.

References

External links
Valley High School Official Website
Escondido Union School District
Escondido Unified High School District

High schools in San Diego County, California
Public high schools in California
Education in Escondido, California